The tender years doctrine is a legal principle in family law since the late 19th century. In common law, it presumes that during a child's "tender" years (generally regarded as the age of four and under), the mother should have custody of the child. The doctrine often arises in divorce proceedings.

History 
Historically, English family law gave custody of the children to the father after a divorce. Until the 19th century, women had few individual rights and obligations, most derived from their fathers or husbands. In the early nineteenth century, Caroline Norton, a prominent social reformer, author, journalist, and society beauty began to campaign for the right of women to have custody of their children. Norton, who had undergone a divorce and been deprived of her children, worked with politicians and eventually was able to convince the British Parliament to enact legislation to protect mothers' rights, with the Custody of Infants Act 1839, which gave some discretion to the judge in a child custody case and established a presumption of maternal custody for children under the age of seven years maintaining the responsibility from financial support to their husbands. In 1873, the Parliament extended the presumption of maternal custody until a child reached sixteen. The doctrine spread in many states of the world because of the British Empire. By the end of the 20th century, the doctrine was established in most of the United States and Europe.

Application

In United States 
The tender years doctrine was frequently used in the 20th century but is gradually being replaced by the "best interests of the child" doctrine of custody through changes in state statutes . Furthermore, several courts have held that the tender years doctrine violates the equal protection clause of the Fourteenth Amendment to the U.S. Constitution. However, state courts still use the doctrine in many cases, which prompted family court reform similar to criminal justice reform.

In Europe 
Most of the states in the EU have gradually abolished the tender years doctrine. In those states, the joint custody is the rule after divorce or the parents' separation. The Principles of the European Family Law regarding the parental responsibilities clarifies that the two parents are equal and their parental responsibilities should neither be affected by the dissolution or annulment of the marriage or other formal relationship nor by the legal or factual separation between the parents.

Maternal preference versus tender years doctrine 
Critics of the family court system, and in particular fathers' rights groups, contend that although the tender years doctrine has formally been replaced by the best interests of the child rule, the older doctrine is still, in practice, how child custody is primarily determined in family courts nationwide. Despite this, in 1989, the Massachusetts Supreme Court's Gender Bias Study reported that "Fathers who actively seek custody obtain either primary or joint physical custody over 70% of the time."  However, others argue the 70% figure is highly misleading because its definition of joint custody was so broad as to include visitation rights, among other issues.

Critics maintain that the father must prove the mother to be an unfit parent before he is awarded primary custody, while the mother need not prove the father unfit to win custody herself, contrary to the Equal Protection Clause.

See also 
 Custody of Infants Act 1873
 Custody of Infants Act 1839
 Caroline Norton

References

Bibliography 
 Blakesley, Christopher L. 1981. "Child Custody and Parental Authority in France, Louisiana and Other States of the United States: A Comparative Analysis" Boston College International and Comparative Law Review, Volume 4, Issue 2.
 Bookspan, Phyllis T. 1993. "From a Tender Years Presumption to a Primary Parent Presumption: Has Anything Really Changed? … Should It?", Brigham Young University Journal of Public Law 8 (January).
 Katz, Sanford N. 1992. "'That They May Thrive' Goal of Child Custody: Reflections on the Apparent Erosion of the Tender Years Presumption and the Emergence of the Primary Caretaker Presumption." Journal of Contemporary Health Law and Policy, Catholic University 8 (spring).
 McLain, Lynn. 1997. "Children Are Losing Maryland's 'Tender Years' War." University of Baltimore Law Review 27 (fall).
 Pica, Derek A. 1999. "The Tender Years Doctrine: Is It Still the Law?" Advocate (Idaho) 38 (January).
 Radke, Lynn E. 1993. "Michigan's New Hearsay Exception: The 'Reinstatement' of the Common Law Tender Years Rule." University of Detroit Mercy Law Review 70 (winter).
 Rinella, Lori. 1995. "Children of Tender Years and Contributory Negligence." UMKC Law Review'' 63 (spring).

Further reading
 
 

Legal doctrines and principles
Family law
Child custody